Polish singer-songwriter Doda has released four studio albums, two live albums, twenty three singles, six promotional singles, and twenty two music videos.

Albums

Studio albums

Live albums

Singles

As lead artist

As featured artist

Promotional singles

Other appearances

Music videos

As lead artist

As featured artist

References 

Pop music discographies
Rock music discographies
Discographies of Polish artists